Ferdinand "Thirdy" Crisologo Ravena III (born December 17, 1996) is a Filipino professional basketball player for San-en NeoPhoenix of the Japanese B.League. Ravena played for the Ateneo Blue Eagles of the UAAP during his college days. He plays the shooting guard position.

Early life
Ravena was born on December 17, 1996 in Iloilo City, Philippines. He is the son of Bong Ravena, who played for the UE Red Warriors and was the 1992 PBA Rookie of the year and Mozzy Crisologo-Ravena, a retired volleyball player who used to play for the UST Golden Tigresses and the Philippines women's national volleyball team. He is also the younger brother of Kiefer Ravena, who is currently playing for the Shiga Lakestars, also in Japan's B.League, and the older brother of Dani Ravena, who is currently playing for the Ateneo Lady Eagles.

Collegiate career

UAAP Season 77 (2014)

Ravena's rookie season was in 2014 alongside his brother Kiefer Ravena. There was a lot of hype surrounding Thirdy's rookie season as he was considered the future of the league. Unfortunately, Thirdy had one of the worst seasons of his up and coming college career.

UAAP Season 78 (2015)

This was supposed to be Thirdy's second year but he had to sit out because of bad grades. It is in the rules of Ateneo sports that you can not play in any league (even if not UAAP) if you have a failing mark.

UAAP Season 79 (2016)

This is officially Thirdy's second playin year where he led the Blue Eagles to the 2nd Seed with a 10–4 win loss record and faced FEU in the semifinals. He helped Ateneo advance to the finals against their archrivals the De La Salle Green Archers in a 2–0 series win by the Green Archers.

UAAP Season 80 (2017)

With Thirdy having experienced 2 years in the UAAP, he led the Blue Eagles to the 1st seed with a 13–1 win–loss record. They once again faced FEU in the semifinals and were in the brink of elimination despite having the twice-to-beat advantage. They faced La Salle in the finals again but this time triumphant winning 2–1 in the best of three finals series. Thirdy grabbed the Finals MVP honors with Ateneo's 9th Championship

UAAP Season 81 (2018)

As defending champions and Ateneo representing the Philippines in that year's Jones Cup, expectations were high for Ateneo. Everyone thought they would sweep it but they lost their first game of the season. After that loss, the Blue Eagles led by Thirdy were fired up and did their best ending with a 12–2 record. Ateneo faced FEU again and won in one game. Thirdy again led Ateneo to back-to-back titles, 10th overall against the UP Fighting Maroons. Thirdy won Finals MVP for the second time in a row with a historical 38 point performance in Game 2 of the UAAP Finals.

UAAP Season 82 (2019)

For Thirdy's final year in the UAAP, he led Ateneo to a 14–0 season sweep and booked them an automatic trip to the finals. For the finals they faced the UST Growling Tigers. Beating them in 2 games for a three-peat and Ateneo's 11th title. Thirdy won Finals MVP for the third straight time (First in UAAP history). Thirdy's 32 point game in Game 1 of the Finals sealed the case for Thirdy's third straight Finals MVP trophy.

Professional career

San-en NeoPhoenix (2020–present)
On June 24, 2020, San-en NeoPhoenix of the B.League announced that it has signed in Ravena for the 2020–21 season. He is the first ever player to be signed-in under the league's Asian Player Quotas system which involve non-Japanese Asian imports. Due to travel restrictions imposed as a response to the COVID-19 pandemic, Ravena was only able to leave the Philippines for Japan in October 2020.

In his debut for the San-en NeoPhoenix, he put up 13 points, 3 rebounds, and 3 assists in an 83-82 win over the Shimane Susanoo Magic. On November 27, 2020, Ravena tested positive for COVID-19 after exhibiting fever which temporarily sidelined him from playing. He rejoined NeoPhoenix, after the team announced that he has recovered by December 11. In January 2021, Thirdy Ravena suffered a finger fracture and missed at least 3 months of B-league games. Ravena played 18 games in his first year with the NeoPhoenix, averaging 9.1 points, 3.6 rebounds, and 1.6 assists in 22.8 minutes per game.

On May 10, 2021, Ravena re-signed with the NeoPhoenix for another season. On October 2, he faced his brother Kiefer and the Shiga Lakestars during the first game of the season, recording 11 points and 6 rebounds in a 93–83 loss.

National team career
Ravena has played for the Philippine national team at the 2019 FIBA Basketball World Cup Asian qualifiers.

References

1996 births
Living people
Ateneo Blue Eagles men's basketball players
Basketball players from Iloilo
Competitors at the 2021 Southeast Asian Games
Filipino expatriate basketball people in Japan
Filipino men's 3x3 basketball players
Filipino men's basketball players
Philippines men's national basketball team players
Philippines national 3x3 basketball team players
San-en NeoPhoenix players
Shooting guards
Southeast Asian Games medalists in basketball
Southeast Asian Games silver medalists for the Philippines
Sportspeople from Iloilo City